Enrique Andrés Martegani (Buenos Aires, 22 February 1925 – Buenos Aires, 20 October 2006) was an Argentine football player who spent the vast majority of his career between Argentina and Italy.

A midfielder and striker, he played for several Argentine teams and in the Italian Serie A with the shirts of Padova, Palermo and Lazio.

External links
Profile at Enciclopedia Del Calcio

1925 births
2006 deaths
Footballers from Buenos Aires
Argentine footballers
Association football midfielders
Chacarita Juniors footballers
Boca Juniors footballers
Estudiantes de La Plata footballers
All Boys footballers
Calcio Padova players
Palermo F.C. players
S.S. Lazio players
Serie A players
Argentine expatriate footballers
Expatriate footballers in Italy